The many-body problem is a general name for a vast category of physical problems pertaining to the properties of microscopic systems made of many interacting particles. Microscopic here implies that quantum mechanics has to be used to provide an accurate description of the system. Many can be anywhere from three to infinity (in the case of a practically infinite, homogeneous or periodic system, such as a crystal), although three- and four-body systems can be treated by specific means (respectively the Faddeev and Faddeev–Yakubovsky equations) and are thus sometimes separately classified as few-body systems.

In general terms, while the underlying physical laws that govern the motion of each individual particle may (or may not) be simple, the study of the collection of particles can be extremely complex. In such a quantum system, the repeated interactions between particles create quantum correlations, or entanglement. As a consequence, the wave function of the system is a complicated object holding a large amount of information, which usually makes exact or analytical calculations impractical or even impossible.

This becomes especially clear by a comparison to classical mechanics. Imagine a single particle that can be described with  numbers (take for example a free particle described by its position and velocity vector, resulting in ). In classical mechanics,  such particles can simply be described by  numbers. The dimension of the classical many-body system scales linearly with the number of particles .
In quantum mechanics, however, the many-body-system is in general in a superposition of combinations of single particle states - all the  different combinations have to be accounted for.

Because the required numerical expense grows so quickly, simulating the dynamics of more than three quantum-mechanical particles is already infeasible for many physical systems. Thus, many-body theoretical physics most often relies on a set of approximations specific to the problem at hand, and ranks among the most computationally intensive fields of science.

In many cases, emergent phenomena may arise which bear little resemblance to the underlying elementary laws.

Many-body problems play a central role in condensed matter physics.

Examples 

 Condensed matter physics (solid-state physics, nanoscience, superconductivity)
 Bose–Einstein condensation and Superfluids
 Quantum chemistry (computational chemistry, molecular physics)
 Atomic physics
 Molecular physics
 Nuclear physics (Nuclear structure, nuclear reactions, nuclear matter)
 Quantum chromodynamics (Lattice QCD, hadron spectroscopy, QCD matter, quark–gluon plasma)

Approaches 

 Mean-field theory and extensions (e.g. Hartree–Fock, Random phase approximation)
 Dynamical mean field theory
 Many-body perturbation theory and Green's function-based methods
 Configuration interaction
 Coupled cluster
 Various Monte-Carlo approaches
 Density functional theory
 Lattice gauge theory
 Matrix product state
 Neural network quantum states
 Numerical renormalization group

Further reading

References

Quantum mechanics
Computational physics